Digama plicata is a moth of the family Erebidae. It is found in Africa, including Tanzania.

External links
 Species info

Aganainae
Moths described in 1952